The Bay Area Technology School (BayTech) is a  located in Oakland, California, United States. BayTech is a college prep middle and high school which serves 6th through 12th grade students from the East Bay Region. The school was established in 2004 by Willow Education Foundation.

External links
 

High schools in Oakland, California
Charter preparatory schools in California
2004 establishments in California